Blackbeard's Ghost is a 1968 American fantasy comedy film directed by Robert Stevenson and starring Peter Ustinov, Dean Jones, and Suzanne Pleshette. It was produced by Walt Disney Productions and Bill Walsh.  It is based upon the 1965 novel of the same name by Ben Stahl and was shot at the Walt Disney Studios.

Plot
Steve Walker (Dean Jones) arrives in a New England seacoast fictional town, called Godolphin, to take the position of track coach at Godolphin College. The night of his arrival coincides with a charity bazaar at the hotel where he will be boarding—Blackbeard's Inn, named after the notorious English pirate Captain Edward Teach and now run by the Daughters of the Buccaneers, elderly descendants of the pirate's crew. The inn had been built from timbers of ships that had run aground in the bay. The owners are attempting to pay off their mortgage to keep the inn from being bought by the local crime boss, Silky Seymour (Joby Baker), who wants to build a casino on the land. Steve quickly discovers his track team's shortcomings and runs afoul of the dean of Godolphin College, its football coach, and Seymour. He also makes the acquaintance of attractive Godolphin professor Jo Anne Baker (Suzanne Pleshette), who is anxious to help the elderly ladies save Blackbeard's Inn.

After a bidding war with the football coach at the charity auction, Steve wins an antique bed warmer once owned by Blackbeard's 10th wife, Aldetha Teach, who had a reputation of being a witch. Inside the hollow wooden handle of this bed warmer is hidden a book of magic spells that had once been the property of Aldetha. Steve recites, on a lark, a spell "to bring to your eyes and ears one who is bound in Limbo", unintentionally conjuring up the ghost of Blackbeard (Peter Ustinov), who appears as a socially-inappropriate drunkard, cursed by his wife to an existence in limbo unless he can perform a good deed.

Steve and Blackbeard are bound to one another by the power of the spell, and only the very reluctant Steve can see or hear the ghost. As a result, Steve must deal with the antics of the wayward pirate while attempting to revive Godolphin's track team and form a relationship with Jo Anne. Steve is falsely arrested for drunk driving when Blackbeard attempts to drive Steve's automobile, steering it like a pirate ship. Because the arresting officer can't see Blackbeard, and because Blackbeard crashed the cop's motorcycle into a tree, Steve spends a night in jail. While in jail, Steve reminds Blackbeard that if he does a good deed, his curse will be broken. Steve asks Blackbeard for his treasure to help the Daughters of the Buccaneers save the inn, but Blackbeard admits that he spent all of the money. Steve decides not to trust Blackbeard.

Steve is released from jail the next morning due to lack of evidence but is put on probation with the college, forced to win the big track meet or be fired from his position. The problem is that Steve's team is sorrowfully weak and ordinarily do not stand a chance at winning. Blackbeard is firmly told by Steve, more than once, not to interfere with the boys on his team or the opposing team either. But Blackbeard creates further complications by stealing one of the Inn's mortgage payments and betting it on Steve's track team. Blackbeard's intention is to use his ghostly powers to help Godolphin win the track meet, and then use the winnings to pay the mortgage in full. Steve is at first outraged by the pirate's interference, but he decides the greater good is to win the money for the sake of the Inn. He also accepts the pirate's help in shaking down Silky Seymour and his thugs after Seymour refuses to pay out the winnings from the bet.

With the mortgage paid, Blackbeard has performed his good deed and is released from the curse. After Steve asks the ladies and Jo Anne to recite the spell, thereby rendering Blackbeard visible to them, Blackbeard bids them all a cordial goodbye and departs to join his former crew, leaving Steve and Jo Anne to pursue their future together.

Cast

Reception
Roger Ebert of the Chicago Sun-Times gave the film three stars out of four and called it "Disney's best since The Absent-Minded Professor and a splendid vehicle for the many talents of Peter Ustinov." Howard Thompson of The New York Times wrote, "The Walt Disney people have delivered a delightful seasonal goody for the young and young-hearted, called Blackbeard's Ghost. After a couple of limp herrings, the master's live-action unit is back on sure footing with the neat, perky and flavorsome little comedy-fantasy that arrived yesterday at neighborhood theaters." Variety declared: "The inspired direction makes it all come alive via firstrate special effects and sight gags, and through a fanciful script that, in a most adroit way, is neither too literate nor too sketchy. Ustinov plays his part to the hilt: mugging and cutting up, as the wandering spirit who must do a good deed to achieve repose." Charles Champlin of the Los Angeles Times praised the film as "a warm and wacky diversion which could not really have been assembled much better." The Monthly Film Bulletin wrote, "Peter Ustinov's exuberant professionalism just about rescues what would otherwise have been a disaster. The basic idea contains a pleasant germ of fantasy, but this is dissipated by a ponderous and self-indulgent script which seems determined to make a mountain out of a molehill. Robert Stevenson's direction is equally pedestrian, and the rather silly fantasy of the crazy sports sequence is a feeble echo of a similar scene in the Marx Brothers' Horse Feathers."

The film earned $5 million in theatrical rentals in North America.

Blackbeard's Ghost has a Rotten Tomatoes approval rating of 82% based on 11 reviews.

Comic book adaptation
 Gold Key: Blackbeard's Ghost (June 1968)

See also
List of American films of 1968
 List of ghost films
Chamatkar, a 1992 Bollywood film inspired by Blackbeard's Ghost.
Pirates of the Caribbean: On Stranger Tides, another Disney film, released in 2011, also featuring Blackbeard.

References

External links
 
Blackbeard's Ghost at UltimateDisney.com

1968 films
1960s fantasy comedy films
1960s children's comedy films
1960s English-language films
American children's comedy films
American children's fantasy films
American ghost films
Cultural depictions of Blackbeard
American fantasy comedy films
Films about curses
Films about witchcraft
Films adapted into comics
Films based on American novels
Films directed by Robert Stevenson
Films produced by Bill Walsh (producer)
Pirate films
Walt Disney Pictures films
1968 comedy films
Limbo
1960s American films